William Melvin "Bill" Libby (November 14, 1927 – June 17, 1984) was an American writer and biographer best known for books on sports including 65 on sports figures.

Early years
Libby graduated from Shortridge High School in Indianapolis, also attended by several notable authors including Kurt Vonnegut. He served in the United States Navy from September 1945 to October 1948. He attended Indiana University from 1948 to 1951. Libby was sports editor of the Herald Statesman, then later worked for the New York Post.

Works
Libby wrote several books on sports figures including Rod Carew, Wilt Chamberlain, Phil Esposito, A. J. Foyt, Catfish Hunter, Fred Lynn, Rocky Marciano, Pete Rose, O. J. Simpson, Willie Stargell, and Fran Tarkenton as well as books on hockey, auto racing, professional football, and college football.

He also co-wrote several books on celebrities and sports people including Nancy Reagan, the Roosevelt family, Rick Barry, Vida Blue, Monty Hall, Richard Petty, John Roseboro, Nolan Ryan, and Jerry West.

Libby national champions
Libby's 1975 book Champions of College Football selected a single college football national champion from the 1900 to 1974 college football seasons.  As the highest level of college football does not have an official national champion, Libby's selections are often referenced by the athletic department of the selected university.

Six of Libby's champions, for the years (1910, 1911, 1913, 1929, 1931, 1936), were not selected for that year as national champion by any NCAA-designated "major selector".

† Champion not selected by any NCAA-designated "major selector".

Awards
In 1964, Libby was named National Magazine Sportswriter of the Year. He was named to the Southern California Jewish Sports Hall of Fame in 2004.

Family
Libby and wife Sharon had two daughters, Allyson and Laurie Libby.

See also
Bill Libby Memorial Award
College football national championships in NCAA Division I FBS

References

1927 births
1984 deaths
20th-century American non-fiction writers
People from Atlantic City, New Jersey
Writers from New Jersey
American male non-fiction writers
Indiana University alumni
20th-century American male writers
Shortridge High School alumni
United States Navy sailors